Nicolas Dufour (born June 1, 1987) is a Canadian politician, who has been mayor of Repentigny, Quebec since the 2021 mayoral election. Previously, he represented the electoral district of Repentigny from the 2008 Canadian federal election until his defeat in 2011. He was a member of the Bloc Québécois.

Dufour was born in Montreal, Quebec. Elected at age 21, Dufour was the youngest member of the Canadian Parliament until his defeat in 2011.

See also
Baby of the House

References

External links

1987 births
Bloc Québécois MPs
French Quebecers
Living people
Mayors of places in Quebec
Members of the House of Commons of Canada from Quebec
People from Repentigny, Quebec
Politicians from Montreal
21st-century Canadian politicians